Raymond Joslin Baillie (February 14, 1935 – May 10, 2015) was a Canadian football player who played for the Calgary Stampeders, Edmonton Eskimos, Montreal Alouettes and Hamilton Tiger Cats. His surviving twin brother, Charlie Baillie, also played in the CFL.

After his CFL career Ray Baillie coached football, for the Ville-Émard Rams, and later coached the Chomedey Chiefs (currently the Panthers). He then joined his twin brother Charlie on the coaching staff of the McGill Redmen. Ray served as defensive coordinator at McGill from 1972 to 1978, including the 1973 season when the Redmen won the Quebec championship.

His primary career was as a teacher for nearly 40 years, most notably at Chomedey Polyvalent High School in Laval, where he taught Canadian history.

After his retirement in 1994, he traveled throughout Quebec along with his wife gathering information and photography for a trilogy of books he would later publish entitled Imprints: Discovering The Historic Face of English Quebec. In 2010, he published a fourth book, Scottish Imprints in Quebec.

References

1935 births
2015 deaths
Anglophone Quebec people
Calgary Stampeders players
Canadian football tackles
Edmonton Elks players
Hamilton Tiger-Cats players
Montreal Alouettes players
Players of Canadian football from Quebec
Canadian football people from Montreal
Canadian twins
Twin sportspeople